Tatiana Zorri is an Italian former football midfielder, who rounded off her career at Bardolino CF in Serie A. She has also played for SS Lazio, Torino CF and UPC Tavagnacco.

She was a member of the Italian national team for 16 years before retiring from international football in 2010, taking part in the 1999 World Cup and the 1997, 2001, 2005 and 2009 European Championships. With 155 games she is the second most capped Italian player next to Patrizia Panico.

Zorri wanted to finish her career in 2012 but played on when she got an offer from Champions League contenders Bardolino. She retired a year later.

References

1977 births
Living people
Italian women's footballers
Italy women's international footballers
FIFA Century Club
S.S. Lazio Women 2015 players
Serie A (women's football) players
1999 FIFA Women's World Cup players
A.S.D. AGSM Verona F.C. players
People from Isola del Liri
Women's association football midfielders
U.P.C. Tavagnacco players
Serie A (women's football) managers
Torino Women A.S.D. players
Footballers from Lazio
Sportspeople from the Province of Frosinone